The Gun Control Act of 1968 (GCA or GCA68) is a U.S. federal law that regulates the firearms industry and firearms ownership. Due to constitutional limitations, the Act is primarily based on regulating interstate commerce in firearms by generally prohibiting interstate firearms transfers except by manufacturers, dealers and importers licensed under a scheme set up under the Act.

The GCA was  signed into law by President Lyndon B. Johnson on October 22, 1968, and is Title I of the U.S. federal firearms laws. The National Firearms Act of 1934 (NFA) is Title II. Both GCA and NFA are enforced by the Bureau of Alcohol, Tobacco, Firearms and Explosives (ATF).

GCA repealed the Federal Firearms Act of 1938, though many of its provisions were reenacted as part of the GCA, which revised the FFA and its predecessor, the National Firearms Act of 1934 (NFA).

History
The bill was initially prompted by the assassination of U.S. President John F. Kennedy in 1963. The President was shot and killed with a rifle purchased by mail order from an ad in the magazine American Rifleman. Congressional hearings followed and a ban on mail-order gun sales was discussed, but no law was passed until 1968. At the hearings NRA Executive Vice-President Franklin Orth supported a ban on mail-order sales, stating, "We do not think that any sane American, who calls himself an American, can object to placing into this bill the instrument which killed the president of the United States."

Precursors of the passage of the Gun Control Act were Senate Bill 1975 in 1963, "A Bill to Regulate the Interstate Shipment of Firearms", and Senate Bill 1592 in 1965, "A Bill to Amend the Federal Firearms Act of 1938". Both were introduced by Senator Thomas J. Dodd and met with fierce opposition on the floor but the bills also paved the way for the creation of the Gun Control Act of 1968.

The April 4, 1968, assassination of Martin Luther King Jr., shortly followed by the June 5 assassination of Robert F. Kennedy, compounded by shifting societal attitudes towards gun ownership, renewed efforts to pass the bill. On June 11, 1968, a tie vote in the House Judiciary Committee halted the bill's passage. On reconsideration nine days later, the bill was passed by the committee. The Senate Judiciary Committee similarly brought the bill to a temporary halt, but as in the House, it was passed on reconsideration. House Resolution 17735, known as the Gun Control Act, was signed into law by President Lyndon B. Johnson on October 22, 1968 banning mail order sales of rifles and shotguns and prohibiting most felons, drug users and people found mentally incompetent from buying guns.

Prohibited persons
The Gun Control Act of 1968 was amended in 1993 by the Brady Handgun Violence Prevention Act which introduced a background check requirement of prospective gun purchasers by licensed sellers, and created a list of categories of individuals to whom the sale of firearms is prohibited:

With the following exceptions:

(ii) A person shall not be considered to have been convicted of such an offense for purposes of this chapter if the conviction has been expunged or set aside, or is an offense for which the person has been pardoned or has had civil rights restored (if the law of the applicable jurisdiction provides for the loss of civil rights under such an offense) unless the pardon, expungement, or restoration of civil rights expressly provides that the person may not ship, transport, possess, or receive firearms.
 
While many states upon completion of sentence automatically reinstate rights to vote, sit on a jury, or serve in public office, no states restore gun ownership rights upon completion of sentence. Some states reinstate rights depending on the crime convicted of, and others have a petition process. Those convicted of a federal offense must contact the Office of the Pardon Attorney, Department of Justice, to receive a presidential pardon. Under the Department's rules governing petitions for executive clemency, 28 C.F.R. §§ 1.1 et seq., an applicant must satisfy a minimum waiting period of five years before he becomes eligible to apply for a presidential pardon of his federal conviction.

According to a 21 Sep 2011 "Open Letter to All Federal Firearms Licensees" from ATF, holders of state-issued medical marijuana cards are automatically "prohibited people" under 18 U.S.C 922 (g)(3) and "shipping, transporting, receiving or possessing firearms or ammunition" by a medical marijuana card holder is a violation.

Additionally, 18 U.S.C 922 (x) generally prohibits people under 18 years of age from possessing handguns or handgun ammunition with certain exceptions for employment, target practice, education, and a handgun possessed while defending the home of the juvenile or a home in which they are an invited guest.

The Brady Handgun Violence Prevention Act of 1993 created the National Instant Criminal Background Check System (NICS) to prevent firearms sales to such prohibited people.

Federal Firearms License (FFL) system

The Gun Control Act mandated the licensing of individuals and companies engaged in the business of selling firearms. This provision effectively prohibited the direct mail order of firearms (except antique firearms) by consumers and mandated that anyone who wants to buy a gun in an interstate transaction from a source other than a private individual must do so through a federally licensed firearms dealer.  The Act also banned unlicensed individuals from acquiring handguns outside their state of residence.  The interstate purchase of long guns (rifles and shotguns) was not impeded by the Act so long as the seller is federally licensed and such a sale is allowed by both the state of purchase and the state of residence.

Private sales between residents of two different states are also prohibited without going through a licensed dealer, except for the case of a buyer holding a Curio & Relic license purchasing a firearm that qualifies as a curio or relic.

Private sales between unlicensed individuals who are residents of the same state are allowed under federal law so long as such transfers do not violate the other existing federal and state laws. While current law mandates that a background check be performed if the seller has a federal firearms license, private parties living in the same state are not required to perform such checks under federal law.

A person who does not have a Federal Firearms License may not be in the business of buying or selling firearms. Individuals buying and selling firearms without a federal license must be doing so from their own personal collection.

Under the Gun Control Act, a federally licensed importer, manufacturer, dealer or collector shall not sell or deliver any rifle or shotgun or ammunition for rifle or shotgun to any individual less than 18 years of age, nor any handgun or ammunition for a handgun to any individual less than 21 years of age.

Gunsmith and factory repair exception
While the Gun Control Act prohibits the direct mail-ordering of firearms, a person may ship a gun via contract carrier (such as United Parcel Service (UPS), United States Postal Service or FedEx) to a gunsmith (who has an FFL) or the gunmaker's factory for repairs or modification. After the repair work is done, the gunsmith or the factory can ship the gun directly back to the customer.

Import restrictions

The GCA created what is known as the "sporting purposes" standard for imported firearms, saying that they must "be generally recognized as particularly suitable for or readily adaptable to sporting purposes". GCA sporting purposes includes hunting and organized competitive target shooting, but does not include "plinking" or "practical shooting" (which the ATF says is closer to police/combat-style competition and not comparable to more traditional types of sports), nor does it allow for collection for historical or design interest.

Marking requirements
The law also required that all newly manufactured firearms produced by licensed manufacturers in the United States and imported into the United States bear a gun serial number. Firearms manufactured prior to the Gun Control Act and firearms manufactured by non-FFLs remain exempt from the serial number requirement. Defacement or removal of the serial number (if present) is a felony offense.

Commentary
In a June 1966 essay, Neal Knox wrote that what was then called the Dodd Bill was opposed by outdoorsmen and conservationists Harry R. Woodward, C. R. Gutermuth of the Wildlife Management Institute, Richard H. Stroud of the Sport Fishing Institute, Howard Carter Jr. of the National Shooting Sports Foundation, E. C. Hadley of the Sporting Arms and Ammunition Manufacturers' Institute, Robert T. Dennis of the Izaak Walton League, "and countless other sportsmen, and sportsmen and industry groups" because it would have a far-reaching and damaging effect on the hunting and shooting sports, while failing to reduce crime.

In his remarks upon signing the act in October 1968, Johnson said:

Congress adopted most of our recommendations. But this bill—as big as this bill is—still falls short, because we just could not get the Congress to carry out the requests we made of them. I asked for the national registration of all guns and the licensing of those who carry those guns. For the fact of life is that there are over 160 million guns in this country—more firearms than families. If guns are to be kept out of the hands of the criminal, out of the hands of the insane, and out of the hands of the irresponsible, then we just must have licensing. If the criminal with a gun is to be tracked down quickly, then we must have registration in this country. The voices that blocked these safeguards were not the voices of an aroused nation. They were the voices of a powerful lobby, a gun lobby, that has prevailed for the moment in an election year.

At the time of its passage in 1968, NRA executive vice president Franklin Orth wrote in American Rifleman that "the measure as a whole appears to be one that the sportsmen of America can live with".

In the May 1993 issue of Guns & Ammo magazine, Jews for the Preservation of Firearms Ownership (JPFO) compared the GCA to Nazi gun laws.

In a 2011 article noting the death of former U.S. Senator James A. McClure, the NRA called provisions of the GCA "draconian". McClure was cosponsor of the Firearm Owners Protection Act (FOPA) of 1986, also called the McClure-Volkmer Act.

Political scientist Robert Spitzer wrote in 2011 that the Gun Control Act of 1968 "provides an ideal case study to highlight the political processes affecting a direct effort to regulate firearms". He also stated in his book that President Johnson's proposal called for national registration of all guns as well as licensing for all gun carriers, but his influence over the enacted law was small. House Rules Committee chair William Colmer only released H.R. 17735 to the floor after Judiciary Committee chair Emanuel Celler promised to oppose efforts to add licensing and registration provisions.

See also
Gun law in the United States
Gun politics in the United States

References

Further reading

External links
Text of H.R. 17735 (90th): An Act to amend title 18, United States Code, to provide for better control of the interstate traffic in firearms (Passed Congress/Enrolled Bill) – GovTrack.us

1968 in American law
90th United States Congress
Gun politics in the United States
United States federal criminal legislation
United States federal firearms legislation
October 1968 events in the United States